Arthur John "Jack" Rowe (1870 – 11 February 1962) was an English professional golfer. Rowe won a tournament at Westward Ho! in 1899 while his best finish in the Open Championship was in 1905 where he finished in a tie for 11th place. He played three times for England against Scotland between 1903 and 1907 and was a professional at Royal Ashdown Forest Golf Club for 55 years.

Early life
Rowe was born in Northam, Devon close to Westward Ho! and the Royal North Devon Golf Club.

Golf career
Rowe was a professional at Douglas, Isle of Man but moved to Royal Ashdown Forest Golf Club on 29 September 1892.

Rowe first played in the Open Championship in 1894 at Royal St George's Golf Club where he finished 23rd. Rowe won a tournament at the Royal North Devon Golf Club in August 1899, where he beat James Braid 3&2 in the 18-hole final. His best finish in The Open was in 1905 when he tied for 11th place. He played for England against Scotland 3 times between 1903 and 1907. He last qualified for the Open Championship in 1924, finishing tied for 47th place. He made his last attempt to qualify at St Andrews in 1939, scoring 77 on the Old Course on the first day but then taking 94 on the New Course.

Rowe retired at professional at Royal Ashdown Forest in 1947 after 55 years service. He played a  fourball match to mark the occasion and went round the course in 76, exactly his age. He was presented with a clock and cheque.

Death
Rowe died on 11 February 1962 aged 91. He was still living in Forest Row close to the Royal Ashdown Forest Golf Club.

Tournament wins (2)
Note: This list may be incomplete.
1899 Westward Ho! Tournament
1908 Sussex Professional Tournament

Results in major championships

Note: Rowe only played in The Open Championship.

NT = No tournament
CUT = missed the half-way cut
"T" indicates a tie for a place

Team appearances
England–Scotland Professional Match (representing England): 1903, 1906 (winners) 1907 (winners)

References

English male golfers
People from Northam, Devon
People from Forest Row
1870 births
1962 deaths